In music, 72 equal temperament, called twelfth-tone, 72-TET, 72-EDO, or 72-ET, is the tempered scale derived by dividing the octave into twelfth-tones, or in other words 72 equal steps (equal frequency ratios). Since 72 is divisible by 1, 2, 3, 4, 6, 8, 9, 12, 18, 24, 36, and 72, 72-EDO includes all those equal temperaments. Since it contains so many temperaments, 72-EDO contains at the same time tempered semitones, third-tones, quartertones and sixth-tones, which makes it a very versatile temperament.

This division of the octave has attracted much attention from tuning theorists, since on the one hand it subdivides the standard 12 equal temperament and on the other hand it accurately represents overtones up to the twelfth partial tone, and hence can be used for 11-limit music. It was theoreticized in the form of twelfth-tones by Alois Hába and Ivan Wyschnegradsky, who considered it as a good approach to the continuum of sound. 72-EDO is also cited among the divisions of the tone by Julián Carrillo, who preferred the sixteenth-tone as an approximation to continuous sound in discontinuous scales.

History and use

Byzantine music
The 72 equal temperament is used in Byzantine music theory, dividing the octave into 72 equal moria, which itself derives from interpretations of the theories of Aristoxenos, who used something similar. Although the 72 equal temperament is based on irrational intervals (see above), as is the 12 tone equal temperament mostly commonly used in Western music (and which is contained as a subset within 72 equal temperament), 72 equal temperament, as a much finer division of the octave, is an excellent tuning for both representing the division of the octave according to the diatonic and the chromatic genera in which intervals are based on ratios between notes, and for representing with great accuracy many rational intervals as well as irrational intervals.

Other history and use
A number of composers have made use of it, and these represent widely different points of view and types of musical practice. These include Alois Hába, Julián Carrillo, Ivan Wyschnegradsky and Iannis Xenakis.

Many other composers use it freely and intuitively, such as jazz musician Joe Maneri, and classically oriented composers such as Julia Werntz and others associated with the Boston Microtonal Society. Others, such as New York composer Joseph Pehrson are interested in it because it supports the use of miracle temperament, and still others simply because it approximates higher-limit just intonation, such as Ezra Sims and James Tenney. There was also an active Soviet school of 72 equal composers, with less familiar names: Evgeny Alexandrovich Murzin, Andrei Volkonsky, Nikolai Nikolsky, Eduard Artemiev, Alexander Nemtin, Andrei Eshpai, Gennady Gladkov, Pyotr Meshchianinov, and Stanislav Kreichi.

The ANS synthesizer uses 72 equal temperament.

Notation

Interval size

Below are the sizes of some intervals (common and esoteric) in this tuning. For reference, differences of less than 5 cents are melodically imperceptible to most people.

Although 12-ET can be viewed as a subset of 72-ET, the closest matches to most commonly used intervals under 72-ET are distinct from the closest matches under 12-ET. For example, the major third of 12-ET, which is sharp, exists as the 24-step interval within 72-ET, but the 23-step interval is a much closer match to the 5:4 ratio of the just major third.

12-ET has a very good approximation for the perfect fifth (third harmonic), especially for such a small number of steps per octave, but compared to the equally-tempered versions in 12-ET, the just major third (fifth harmonic) is off by about a sixth of a step, the seventh harmonic is off by about a third of a step, and the eleventh harmonic is off by about half of a step. This suggests that if each step of 12-ET were divided in six, the fifth, seventh, and eleventh harmonics would now be well-approximated, while 12-ET's excellent approximation of the third harmonic would be retained. Indeed, all intervals involving harmonics up through the 11th are matched very closely in 72-ET; no intervals formed as the difference of any two of these intervals are tempered out by this tuning system. Thus, 72-ET can be seen as offering an almost perfect approximation to 7-, 9-, and 11-limit music. When it comes to the higher harmonics, a number of intervals are still matched quite well, but some are tempered out. For instance, the comma 169:168 is tempered out, but other intervals involving the 13-th harmonic are distinguished.

Unlike tunings such as 31-ET and 41-ET, 72-ET contains many intervals which do not closely match any small-number (<16) harmonics in the harmonic series.

Scale diagram

Because 72-EDO contains 12-EDO, the scale of 12-EDO is in 72-EDO. However, the true scale can be approximated better by other intervals.

See also
Musical temperament
Equal temperament

References

External links 
 The Boston Microtonal Society official site
 
 Sagittal.org
 "Sagittal notation", The Xenharmonic wiki
 —symbols for Maneri-Sims notation and others
 Byzantine Music Electroacoustic Music

Equal temperaments
Byzantine music
Microtonality